Donald MacNeil Fairfax (March 10, 1818 – January 10, 1894) was an officer in the United States Navy during the American Civil War.

Early life and family
The son of George William Fairfax, and Isabella McNeill, grandson of Ferdinando Fairfax, and great-grandson of Bryan Fairfax, he was born at Mount Eagle, Virginia. Fairfax entered the Navy as a midshipman on August 12, 1837.  He was the only member of the family who took the Union side in the American Civil War.

The Trent Affair
On November 8, 1861, Fairfax boarded Trent to remove Confederate commissioners James M. Mason and John Slidell, after the ship had been stopped by his captain, Charles Wilkes.

Wilkes had given Fairfax the following written instructions:

Fairfax demanded the passenger list, but Mason and Slidell identified themselves. He escorted Mason by the collar, to the cutter, and with two officers took hold of Slidell from the main cabin.  He failed to claim Trent as a prize, citing the loss of manpower of a prize crew (avoiding a worse incident).

Civil War Service

Fairfax was later promoted to flag rank, retiring as a rear admiral on September 30, 1881.  He retired to Hagerstown, Maryland, where he served on the vestry of Saint John's Church.  Admiral Fairfax died in 1894.

Namesake

References

1818 births
1894 deaths
19th-century American Episcopalians
American people of English descent
American people of Scottish descent
Burials at Rose Hill Cemetery (Hagerstown, Maryland)
Episcopalians from Maryland
Episcopalians from Virginia
Donald
Military personnel from Maryland
Military personnel from Virginia
People from Fairfax County, Virginia
People from Hagerstown, Maryland
People of Virginia in the American Civil War
Union Navy officers
United States Navy rear admirals (upper half)